Digital Ghosts is the sixth album by the progressive-metal group Shadow Gallery. It was released on October 23, 2009 in Europe and November 3, 2009 in the U.S. This is the first album since their former singer Mike Baker died on October 29, 2008.

Track listing

 "Two Shadows" is a reworked song (a Japanese bonus track from disc Room V) with vocals by Mike Baker.
 "Gold Dust" is a demo version of album song with vocals by Carl-Cadden James.
 "In Your Window" is a cappella version of the vocal harmonies from the album song "Digital Ghost".
 "World of Fantasy" is a demo version of a non-album song with vocals by Mike Baker.

Although the tracks on the album are the same as on the cover the ID tags are all wrong. The album comes up as Prime Cuts and the tracks come up as the first 11 tracks from Prime Cuts.

Personnel
 Gary Wehrkamp – electric & acoustic guitars, bass guitar, keyboards, vocals, drums
 Brendt Allman – electric & acoustic guitars, bass guitar, keyboards, vocals
 Carl Cadden-James – bass guitar, fretless bass, flute, vocals (shares lead vocals on "Venom")
 Brian Ashland – lead vocals, guitar solo on "With Honor"
 Joe Nevolo – drums on "Venom" and "Gold Dust"

Additional musicians
 Ralf Scheepers (Primal Fear) – lead vocals on "Strong"
 Clay Barton (Suspyre) – lead vocals on "Venom"
 Srđan Branković (Expedition Delta, AlogiA) – guitars on "Strong"
 Vivien Lalu (Shadrane) – keyboards on "Gold Dust"
 Mike Baker – vocals on "Two Shadows" and "World of Fantasy"

References

Shadow Gallery albums
2009 albums
Inside Out Music albums